Laurel and Hardy were a British-American comedy duo act during the early Classical Hollywood era of American cinema, consisting of Englishman Stan Laurel (1890–1965) and American Oliver Hardy (1892–1957). Starting their career as a duo in the silent film era, they later successfully transitioned to "talkies". From the late 1920s to the mid-1950s, they were internationally famous for their slapstick comedy, with Laurel playing the clumsy, childlike friend to Hardy's pompous bully. Their signature theme song, known as "The Cuckoo Song", "Ku-Ku", or "The Dance of the Cuckoos" (by Hollywood composer T. Marvin Hatley) was heard over their films' opening credits, and became as emblematic of them as their bowler hats.

Prior to emerging as a team, both had well-established film careers. Laurel had acted in over 50 films, and worked as a writer and director, while Hardy was in more than 250 productions. Both had appeared in The Lucky Dog (1921), but were not teamed at the time. They first appeared together in a short film in 1926, when they signed separate contracts with the Hal Roach film studio. They officially became a team in 1927 when they appeared in the silent short Putting Pants on Philip. They remained with Roach until 1940, and then appeared in eight B movie comedies for 20th Century Fox and Metro-Goldwyn-Mayer from 1941 to 1945. After finishing their film commitments at the end of 1944, they concentrated on performing stage shows, and embarked on a music hall tour of England, Ireland, Wales, and Scotland. They made their last film in 1950, a French–Italian co-production called Atoll K.

They appeared as a team in 107 films, starring in 32 short silent films, 40 short sound films, and 23 full-length feature films. They also made 12 guest or cameo appearances, including in the Galaxy of Stars promotional film of 1936. On December 1, 1954, they made their sole American television appearance, when they were surprised and interviewed by Ralph Edwards on his live NBC-TV program This Is Your Life. Since the 1930s, their works have been released in numerous theatrical reissues, television revivals, 8-mm and 16-mm home movies, feature-film compilations, and home videos. In 2005, they were voted the seventh-greatest comedy act of all time by a UK poll of professional comedians. The official Laurel and Hardy appreciation society is The Sons of the Desert, after a fictitious fraternal society in the film of the same name.

Early careers

Stan Laurel

Stan Laurel (June 16, 1890 – February 23, 1965) was born Arthur Stanley Jefferson in Ulverston, Lancashire, England, into a theatrical family. His father, Arthur Joseph Jefferson, was a theatrical entrepreneur and theatre owner in northern England and Scotland who, with his wife, was a major force in the industry. In 1905, the Jefferson family moved to Glasgow to be closer to their business mainstay of the Metropole Theatre, and Laurel made his stage debut in a Glasgow hall called the Britannia Panopticon one month short of his 16th birthday. Arthur Jefferson secured Laurel his first acting job with the juvenile theatrical company of Levy and Cardwell, which specialized in Christmas pantomimes. In 1909, Laurel was employed by Britain's leading comedy impresario Fred Karno as a supporting actor, and as an understudy for Charlie Chaplin. Laurel said of Karno, "There was no one like him. He had no equal. His name was box-office."

In 1912, Laurel left England with the Fred Karno Troupe to tour the United States. Laurel had expected the tour to be merely a pleasant interval before returning to London; however, he decided to remain in the U.S. In 1917, Laurel was teamed with Mae Dahlberg as a double act for stage and film; they were living as common-law husband and wife. The same year, Laurel made his film debut with Dahlberg in Nuts in May. While working with Mae, he began using the name "Stan Laurel" and changed his name legally in 1931. Dahlberg demanded roles in his films, and her tempestuous nature made her difficult to work with. Dressing room arguments were common between the two; it was reported that producer Joe Rock paid her to leave Laurel and to return to her native Australia. In 1925, Laurel joined the Hal Roach film studio as a director and writer. From May 1925 to September 1926, he received credit in at least 22 films. Laurel appeared in over 50 films for various producers before teaming up with Hardy. Prior to that, he experienced only modest success. It was difficult for producers, writers, and directors to write for his character, with American audiences knowing him either as a "nutty burglar" or as a Charlie Chaplin imitator.

Oliver Hardy

Oliver Hardy (January 18, 1892 – August 7, 1957) was born Norvell Hardy in Harlem, Georgia, United States. By his late teens, Hardy was a popular stage singer and he operated a movie house in Milledgeville, Georgia, the Palace Theater, financed in part by his mother. For his stage name he took his father's first name, calling himself "Oliver Norvell Hardy", while offscreen his nicknames were "Ollie" and "Babe". The nickname "Babe" originated from an Italian barber near the Lubin Studios in Jacksonville, Florida, who would rub Hardy's face with talcum powder and say "That's nice-a baby!" Other actors in the Lubin company mimicked this, and Hardy was billed as "Babe Hardy" in his early films.

Seeing film comedies inspired him to take up comedy himself and, in 1913, he began working with Lubin Motion Pictures in Jacksonville. He started by helping around the studio with lights, props, and other duties, gradually learning the craft as a script-clerk for the company. It was around this time that Hardy married his first wife, Madelyn Saloshin. In 1914, Hardy was billed as "Babe Hardy" in his first film, Outwitting Dad. Between 1914 and 1916 Hardy made 177 shorts as Babe with the Vim Comedy Company, which were released up to the end of 1917. Exhibiting a versatility in playing heroes, villains and even female characters, Hardy was in demand for roles as a supporting actor, comic villain or second banana. For 10 years he memorably assisted star comic and Charlie Chaplin imitator Billy West, and appeared in the comedies of Jimmy Aubrey, Larry Semon, and Charley Chase. In total, Hardy starred or co-starred in more than 250 silent shorts, of which roughly 150 have been lost. He was rejected for enlistment by the Army during World War I due to his large size. In 1917, following the collapse of the Florida film industry, Hardy and his wife Madelyn moved to California to seek new opportunities.

History as Laurel and Hardy

Hal Roach
Hal Roach recounted how Laurel and Hardy became a team: Hardy was already working for Roach (and others) when Roach hired Laurel, whom he had seen in vaudeville. Laurel had very light blue eyes, and Roach discovered that, due to the technology of film at that time, Laurel's eyes wouldn't photograph properly—blue photographed as white. This problem is apparent in their first silent film together, The Lucky Dog, where an attempt was made to compensate for the problem by applying heavy makeup to Laurel's eyes. For about a year, Roach had Laurel work at the studio as a writer. Then panchromatic film was developed; they tested Laurel, and found the problem was solved. Laurel and Hardy were then put together in a film, and they seemed to complement each other. Comedy teams were usually composed of a straight man and a funny man, but these two were both comedians; however, each knew how to play the straight man when the script required it. Roach said, "You could always cut to a close-up of either one, and their reaction was good for another laugh."

Style of comedy and characterisations

The humor of Laurel and Hardy was highly visual, with slapstick used for emphasis. They often had physical arguments (in character) which were quite complex and involved a cartoonish style of violence. Their ineptitude and misfortune precluded them from making any real progress, even in the simplest endeavors. Much of their comedy involves "milking" a joke, where a simple idea provides a basis for multiple, ongoing gags without following a defined narrative.

Details of their hair and clothing were used to enhance this natural contrast. Laurel kept his hair short on the sides and back, growing it long on top to create a natural "fright wig". Typically, at times of shock, he simultaneously screwed up his face to appear as if crying while pulling up his hair. In contrast, Hardy's thinning hair was pasted on his forehead in spit curls and he sported a toothbrush moustache. To achieve a flat-footed walk, Laurel removed the heels from his shoes. Both wore bowler hats, with Laurel's being narrower than Hardy's, and with a flattened brim. The characters' normal attire called for wing collar shirts, with Hardy wearing a necktie which he would twiddle when he was particularly self-conscious; and Laurel, a bow tie. Hardy's sports jacket was a little small and done up with one straining button, whereas Laurel's double-breasted jacket was loose-fitting.

A popular routine was a "tit for tat" fight with an adversary. It could be with their wives—often played by Mae Busch, Anita Garvin, or Daphne Pollard—or with a neighbor, often played by Charlie Hall or James Finlayson. Laurel and Hardy would accidentally damage someone's property, and the injured party would retaliate by ruining something belonging to Laurel or Hardy. After calmly surveying the damage, one or the other of the "offended" parties found something else to vandalize, and the conflict escalated until both sides were simultaneously destroying items in front of each other. An early example of the routine occurs in their classic short Big Business (1929), which was added to the National Film Registry in 1992. Another short film which revolves around such an altercation was titled Tit for Tat (1935).

One of their best-remembered dialogue devices was the "Tell me that again" routine. Laurel would tell Hardy a genuinely smart idea he came up with, and Hardy would reply, "Tell me that again." Laurel would then try to repeat the idea, but, having instantly forgotten it, babble utter nonsense. Hardy, who had difficulty understanding Laurel's idea when expressed clearly, would then understand the jumbled version perfectly. While much of their comedy remained visual, humorous dialogue often occurred in Laurel and Hardy's talking films as well. Examples include:
 "You can lead a horse to water, but a pencil must be led." (Laurel, Brats)
 "I was dreaming I was awake, but I woke up and found meself asleep." (Laurel, Oliver the Eighth)
 "A lot of weather we've been having lately." (Hardy, Way Out West)

In some cases, their comedy bordered on the surreal, in a style Laurel called "white magic". For example, in the 1937 film Way Out West, Laurel flicks his thumb upward as if working a lighter. His thumb ignites and he matter-of-factly lights Hardy's pipe. Amazed at seeing this, Hardy unsuccessfully attempts to duplicate it throughout the film. Much later he finally succeeds, only to be terrified when his thumb catches fire. Laurel expands the joke in the 1938 film Block-Heads by pouring tobacco into his clenched fist and smoking it as though it were a pipe, again to Hardy's bemusement. This time, the joke ends when a match Laurel was using relights itself, Hardy throws it into the fireplace, and it explodes with a loud bang.

Rather than showing Hardy suffering the pain of misfortunes, such as falling down stairs or being beaten by a thug, banging and crashing sound effects were often used so the audience could visualize the mayhem. The 1927 film Sailors, Beware! was a significant one for Hardy because two of his enduring trademarks were developed. The first was his "tie twiddle" to demonstrate embarrassment. Hardy, while acting, had received a pail of water in the face. He said, "I had been expecting it, but I didn't expect it at that particular moment. It threw me mentally and I couldn't think what to do next, so I waved the tie in a kind of tiddly-widdly fashion to show embarrassment while trying to look friendly." His second trademark was the "camera look", where he breaks the fourth wall and, in frustration, stares directly at the audience. Hardy said: "I had to become exasperated, so I just stared right into the camera and registered my disgust." Offscreen, Laurel and Hardy were quite the opposite of their movie characters: Laurel was the industrious "idea man", while Hardy was more easygoing.

Catchphrases
Laurel and Hardy's best-known catchphrase is, "Well, here's another nice mess you've gotten me into!" It was earlier used by W. S. Gilbert in both The Mikado (1885) and The Grand Duke (1896). It was first used by Hardy in The Laurel-Hardy Murder Case in 1930. In popular culture, the catchphrase is often misquoted as "Well, here's another fine mess you've gotten me into", which was never spoken by Hardy—a misunderstanding that stems from the title of their film Another Fine Mess. When Hardy said the phrase, Laurel's frequent, iconic response was to start to cry, pull his hair up, exclaim "Well, I couldn't help it...", then whimper and speak gibberish.

Some variations on the phrase occurred. For example, in Chickens Come Home, Ollie impatiently says to Stan, "Well...", and Stan continues for him: "Here's another nice mess I've gotten you into." The films Thicker than Water and The Fixer Uppers use the phrase "Well, here's another nice kettle of fish you've pickled me in!" In Saps at Sea, the phrase becomes "Well, here's another nice bucket of suds you've gotten me into!" The catchphrase, in its original form, was fittingly used as the last line of dialogue in the duo's last film, Atoll K (1951).

In moments of particular distress or frustration, Hardy often exclaims, "Why don't you do something to help me?", as Laurel stands helplessly by.

"OH!" (or drawn out as "Ohhhhh-OH!") was another catchphrase used by Hardy. He uses the expression in the duo's first sound film, Unaccustomed As We Are (1929) when his character's wife smashes a record over his head. 

Mustachioed Scottish actor James Finlayson, who appeared in 33 Laurel and Hardy films, used a variation: "D'oh!" The phrase, expressing surprise, impatience, or incredulity, inspired the trademark "D'oh!" of character Homer Simpson (voiced by Dan Castellaneta) in the long-running animated comedy The Simpsons.

Films

Laurel's and Hardy's first film pairing, although as separate performers, was in the silent The Lucky Dog. Its production details have not survived, but film historian Bo Berglund has placed it between September 1920 and January 1921. According to interviews they gave in the 1930s, the pair's acquaintance at the time was casual, and both had forgotten their initial film entirely. The plot sees Laurel's character befriended by a stray dog which, after some lucky escapes, saves him from being blown up by dynamite. Hardy's character is a mugger attempting to rob Laurel. They later signed separate contracts with the Hal Roach Studios, and next appeared in the 1926 film 45 Minutes From Hollywood.

Hal Roach is considered the most important person in the development of Laurel's and Hardy's film careers. He brought them together, and they worked for Roach for almost 20 years. Director Charley Rogers, who worked closely with the three men for many years, said, "It could not have happened if Laurel, Hardy, and Roach had not met at the right place and the right time." Their first "official" film together was Putting Pants on Philip, released December 3, 1927. The plot involves Laurel as Philip, a young Scotsman who arrives in the United States in full kilted splendor, and suffers mishaps involving the kilts. His uncle, played by Hardy, tries to put trousers on him. Also in 1927, the pair starred in The Battle of the Century, a classic pie-throwing short involving over 3,000 real pies; only a fragment of the film was known to exist until the first half resurfaced in the 1970s; a more complete print was discovered in 2015 by historian Jon Mirsalis.

Laurel said to the duo's biographer John McCabe: "Of all the questions we're asked, the most frequent is, how did we come together? I always explain that we came together naturally." Laurel and Hardy were joined by accident and grew by indirection. In 1926, both were part of the Roach Comedy All Stars, a stock company of actors who took part in a series of films. Laurel's and Hardy's parts gradually grew larger, while those of their fellow stars diminished, because Laurel and Hardy had superior pantomime skills. Their teaming was suggested by Leo McCarey, their supervising director from 1927 and 1930. During that period, McCarey and Laurel jointly devised the team's format. McCarey also influenced the slowing of their comedy action from the silent era's typically frantic pace to a more natural one. The formula worked so well that Laurel and Hardy played the same characters for the next 30 years.

Although Roach employed writers and directors such as H. M. Walker, Leo McCarey, James Parrott, and James W. Horne on the Laurel and Hardy films, Laurel, who had a considerable background in comedy writing, often rewrote entire sequences and scripts. He also encouraged the cast and crew to improvise, then meticulously reviewed the footage during editing. By 1929, he was the pair's head writer, and it was reported that the writing sessions were gleefully chaotic. Stan had three or four writers who competed with him in a perpetual game of 'Can You Top This?' Hardy was quite happy to leave the writing to his partner. He said, "After all, just doing the gags was hard enough work, especially if you have taken as many falls and been dumped in as many mudholes as I have. I think I earned my money." Laurel eventually became so involved in their films' productions, many film historians and afficionadi consider him an uncredited director. He ran the Laurel and Hardy set, no matter who was in the director's chair, but never asserted his authority. Roach remarked: "Laurel bossed the production. With any director, if Laurel said 'I don't like this idea,' the director didn't say 'Well, you're going to do it anyway.' That was understood." As Laurel made so many suggestions, there was not much left for the credited director to do.

Their 1929 silent Big Business is by far the most critically acclaimed. Laurel and Hardy are Christmas tree salesmen who are drawn into a classic tit-for-tat battle, with a character played by James Finlayson, that eventually destroys his house and their car. Big Business was added to the United States National Film Registry as a national treasure in 1992.

Sound films
In 1929 the silent era of film was coming to an end. Many silent-film actors failed to make the transition to "talkies"—some, because they felt sound was irrelevant to their craft of conveying stories with body language; and others, because their spoken voices were considered inadequate for the new medium. However, the addition of spoken dialogue only enhanced Laurel's and Hardy's performances; both had extensive theatrical experience, and could use their voices to great comic effect. Their films also continued to feature much visual comedy. In these ways, they made a seamless transition to their first sound film, Unaccustomed As We Are (1929) (whose title took its name from the familiar phrase, "Unaccustomed as we are to public speaking"). In the opening dialogue, Laurel and Hardy began by spoofing the slow and self-conscious speech of the early talking actors which became a routine they would use regularly.

The Music Box (1932), with the pair delivering a piano up a long flight of steps, won an Academy Award for Best Live Action Short Subject. The Music Box remains one of the duo's most widely known films.

Laurel and Hardy were favorites around the world, and Hal Roach catered to international audiences by filming many of their early talkies in other languages. They spoke their dialogue phonetically, in Spanish, Italian, French, or German. The plots remained similar to the English versions, although the supporting actors were often changed to those who were fluent in the native language. Pardon Us (1931) was reshot in all four foreign languages. Blotto, Hog Wild and Be Big! were remade in French and Spanish versions. Night Owls was remade in both Spanish and Italian, and Below Zero and Chickens Come Home in Spanish.

Feature films
Just as Laurel and Hardy's teaming was accidental, so was their entry into the field of feature films. In the words of biographer John McCabe, "Roach planned to use the MGM set [built for The Big House] for a simple prison-break two-reeler but MGM suddenly added a proviso: Laurel and Hardy would have to do a picture for them in exchange. Roach would not agree so he built his own prison set, a very expensive item for a two-reeler. So expensive was it indeed that he added four more reels to bring it into the feature category and, it was hoped, the bigger market." The experiment was successful, and the team continued to make features along with their established short subjects until 1935, when they converted to features exclusively.

Sons of the Desert (1933) is often cited as Laurel and Hardy's best feature-length film. The situation-comedy script by actor-playwright Frank Craven and screenwriter Byron Morgan is stronger than usual for a Laurel & Hardy comedy. Stan and Ollie are henpecked husbands who want to attend a convention held by the Sons of the Desert fraternal lodge. They tell their wives that Ollie requires an ocean voyage to Honolulu for his health, and they sneak off to the convention. They are unaware that the Honolulu-bound ship they were supposedly aboard is sinking, and the wives confront their errant husbands when they get home.

Babes in Toyland (1934) remains a perennial on American television during the Christmas season. When interviewed, Hal Roach spoke scathingly about the film and Laurel's behavior. Roach himself had written a treatment detailing the characters and storyline, only to find that Laurel considered Roach's effort totally unsuitable. Roach, affronted, tried to argue in favor of his treatment, but Laurel was adamant. Roach angrily gave up and allowed Laurel to make the film his way. The rift damaged Roach-Laurel relations to the point that Roach said that after Toyland, he didn't want to produce for Laurel and Hardy. Although their association continued for another six years, Roach no longer took an active hand in Laurel and Hardy films.

Way Out West (1937) was a personal favorite of both Stan Laurel and Oliver Hardy. A satire of the Gene Autry musical westerns sweeping America at the time, the film combines Laurel and Hardy's slapstick routines with songs and dances performed by the stars.

It appeared that the team would split permanently in 1938. Hal Roach had become dissatisfied with his distribution arrangement with Metro-Goldwyn-Mayer, and had begun releasing his films through United Artists. He still owed MGM one last feature, and made the Laurel and Hardy comedy Block-Heads, with the announcement that this would be Laurel and Hardy's farewell film. Stan Laurel's contract with Roach then expired, and Roach did not renew it. Oliver Hardy's contract was still in force, however, and Roach starred Hardy solo in the antebellum comedy Zenobia (1939), with Harry Langdon as Hardy's comic foil. This fueled rumors that Laurel and Hardy had split on bad terms.

After Zenobia, Laurel rejoined Hardy and the team signed with independent producer Boris Morros for the comedy feature The Flying Deuces (1939). Meanwhile, Hal Roach wanted to demonstrate his new idea of making four-reel, 40-minute featurettes -- twice the length of standard two-reel, 20-minute comedies -- which Roach felt could fit more conveniently into double-feature programs. He referred to these extended films as "streamliners". To test his theory, Roach rehired Laurel and Hardy. The resulting films, A Chump at Oxford and Saps at Sea (both 1940), were prepared as featurettes. United Artists overruled Roach and insisted that they be released as full-length features.

Hoping for greater artistic freedom, Laurel and Hardy split with Roach, and signed with 20th Century-Fox in 1941 and MGM in 1942. However, their working conditions were now completely different: they were simply hired actors, relegated to both studios’ B-film units, and not initially allowed to contribute to the scripts or improvise, as they had always done. When their films proved popular, the studios allowed them more input, and they starred in eight features until the end of 1944. These films, while far from their best work, were still very successful. Budgeted between $300,000 and $450,000 each, they earned millions at the box office for Fox and MGM. The Fox films were so profitable that the studio kept making Laurel and Hardy comedies after it discontinued its other "B" series films.

The busy team decided to take a rest during 1946, but 1947 saw their first European tour in 15 years. A film based in the charters of "Robin Hood" was planned during the tour, but not realized. In 1947, Laurel and Hardy famously attended the reopening of the Dungeness loop of the Romney, Hythe and Dymchurch Railway, where they performed improvised routines with a steam locomotive for the benefit of local crowds and dignitaries.

In 1948, on the team's return to America, Laurel was sidelined by illness and temporarily unable to work. He encouraged Hardy to take movie roles on his own. Hardy's friend John Wayne hired him to co-star in The Fighting Kentuckian for Republic Pictures, and Bing Crosby got him a small part in Frank Capra's Riding High.

In 1950–51, Laurel and Hardy made their final feature-length film together, Atoll K. A French-Italian co-production directed by Léo Joannon, it was plagued by problems with language barriers, production issues, and both actors' serious health issues. When Laurel received the script's final draft, he felt its heavy political content overshadowed the comedy. He quickly rewrote it, with screen comic Monte Collins contributing visual gags, and hired old friend Alfred Goulding to direct the Laurel and Hardy scenes. During filming, Hardy developed an irregular heartbeat, while Laurel experienced painful prostate complications that caused his weight to drop to 114 pounds. Critics were disappointed with the storyline, English dubbing, and Laurel's sickly physical appearance. The film was not commercial successful on its first release, and brought an end to Laurel and Hardy's film careers. Atoll K did finally turn a profit when it was rereleased in other countries. In 1954, an American distributor removed 18 minutes of footage and released it as Utopia; widely released on film and video, it is the film's best-known version.

After Atoll K wrapped in April 1951, Laurel and Hardy returned to America and used the remainder of the year to rest. Stan appeared, in character, in a silent TV newsreel, Swim Meet, judging a local California swimming contest.

Most Laurel and Hardy films have survived and are still in circulation. Only three of their 107 films are considered lost and have not been seen in complete form since the 1930s. The silent film Hats Off from 1927 has vanished completely. The first half of Now I'll Tell One (1927) is lost, and the second half has yet to be released on video. The Battle of the Century (1927), after years of obscurity, is now almost complete but a few minutes are missing. In the 1930 operatic Technicolor musical The Rogue Song, Laurel and Hardy appeared as comedy relief in 10 sequences; only one exists. The complete soundtrack has survived.

Radio
Laurel and Hardy made at least two audition recordings for radio, a half-hour NBC series, based on the skit, Driver’s License, and a 1944 NBC pilot for "The Laurel and Hardy Show," casting Stan and Ollie in different occupations each episode. The surviving audition record, "Mr. Slater's Poultry Market," has Stan and Ollie as meat-market butchers mistaken for vicious gangsters. A third attempt was commissioned by BBC Radio in 1953: "Laurel and Hardy Go to the Moon," a series of science-fiction comedies. A sample script was written by Tony Hawes and Denis Gifford, and the comedians staged a read-through, which was not recorded. The team was forced to withdraw due to Hardy's declining health, and the project was abandoned.

Final years
Following the making of Atoll K, Laurel and Hardy took some months off to deal with health issues. On their return to the European stage in 1952, they undertook a well-received series of public appearances, performing a short Laurel-written sketch, "A Spot of Trouble". The following year, Laurel wrote a routine entitled "Birds of a Feather". On September 9, 1953, their boat arrived in Cobh in Ireland. Laurel recounted their reception:

On May 17, 1954, Laurel and Hardy made their last live stage performance in Plymouth, UK at the Palace Theatre. On December 1, 1954, they made their only American television appearance when they were surprised and interviewed by Ralph Edwards on his live NBC-TV program This Is Your Life. Lured to the Knickerbocker Hotel under the pretense of a business meeting with producer Bernard Delfont, the doors opened to their suite, #205, flooding the room with light and Edwards' voice. The telecast was preserved on a kinescope and later released on home video. Partly due to the broadcast's positive response, the team began renegotiating with Hal Roach Jr. for a series of color NBC Television specials, to be called Laurel and Hardy's Fabulous Fables. However, the plans had to be shelved as the aging comedians continued to suffer from declining health. In 1955, America's magazine TV Guide ran a color spread on the team with current photos. That year, they made their final public appearance together while taking part in This Is Music Hall, a BBC Television program about the Grand Order of Water Rats, a British variety organization. Laurel and Hardy provided a filmed insert where they reminisced about their friends in British variety. They made their final appearance on camera in 1956 in a private home movie, shot by a family friend at the Reseda, California home of Stan Laurel's daughter, Lois. The three-minute film has no audio.

Despite his long and successful career, Hardy's home was sold to help cover his medical expenses. He died of a stroke on August 7, 1957, and longtime friend Bob Chatterton said Hardy weighed just  at the time of his death. Hardy was laid to rest at Pierce Brothers' Valhalla Memorial Park, North Hollywood. Following Hardy's death, scenes from Laurel and Hardy's early films were seen once again in theaters, featured in Robert Youngson's silent-film compilation The Golden Age of Comedy.

For the remaining eight years of his life, Stan Laurel refused to perform, and declined Stanley Kramer's offer of a cameo in his landmark 1963 film It's a Mad, Mad, Mad, Mad World. In 1960, Laurel was given a special Academy Award for his contributions to film comedy, but was unable to attend the ceremony due to poor health. Actor Danny Kaye accepted the award on his behalf. Despite not appearing on screen after Hardy's death, Laurel did contribute gags to several comedy filmmakers. His favorite TV comedy was Leonard B. Stern's I'm Dickens, He's Fenster, co-starring John Astin and Marty Ingels as carpenters. Laurel enjoyed the Astin-Ingels chemistry and sent two-man gags to Stern.

During this period, most of his communication was in the form of written correspondence, and he insisted on personally answering every fan letter. Late in life, he welcomed visitors from the new generation of comedians and celebrities, including Dick Cavett, Jerry Lewis, Peter Sellers, Marcel Marceau, Johnny Carson, and Dick Van Dyke. Jerry Lewis offered Laurel a job as consultant, but he chose to help only on Lewis's 1960 feature The Bellboy.

Dick Van Dyke was a longtime fan, and based his comedy and dancing styles on Laurel's. When he discovered Laurel's home number in the phone book and called him, Laurel invited him over for the afternoon. Van Dyke hosted a television tribute to Stan Laurel the year he died.

Laurel lived to see the duo's work rediscovered through television and classic film revivals. He died on February 23, 1965, in Santa Monica and is buried at Forest Lawn-Hollywood Hills in Los Angeles, California.

Supporting cast members
Laurel and Hardy's films included a supporting cast of comic actors, some of whom appeared regularly:
Harry Bernard played bit parts as a waiter, bartender, or policeman.
Mae Busch often played the formidable Mrs. Hardy and other characters, particularly sultry femmes fatales.
Charley Chase, the Hal Roach film star and brother of James Parrott, a writer/director of several Laurel and Hardy films, made four appearances.
Dorothy Coburn appeared in nearly a dozen early silent shorts.
Baldwin Cooke played bit parts as a waiter or neighbor.
Richard Cramer appeared as a scowling, menacing villain or opponent.
Peter Cushing, well before becoming a star in Hammer Horror films, played one of the students in A Chump at Oxford.
Bobby Dunn appeared as a cross-eyed bartender and telegram messenger, as well as the genial shoplifter in Tit for Tat.
Eddie Dunn made several appearances, notably as the belligerent taxi driver in Me and My Pal. 
James Finlayson, a balding, mustachioed Scotsman known for displays of indignation and squinting, pop-eyed "double takes," made 33 appearances and is perhaps their most celebrated foil.
Anita Garvin appeared in a number of Laurel and Hardy films, often cast as Mrs. Laurel.
Billy Gilbert made many appearances, most notably as bombastic, blustery characters such as those in The Music Box (1932) and Block-Heads.
Charlie Hall, who usually played angry, diminutive adversaries, appeared nearly 50 times.
Jean Harlow had a small role in the silent short Double Whoopee (1929) and two other films in the early part of her career.
Arthur Housman made several appearances as a comic drunk.
Isabelle Keith was the only actress to appear as wife to both Laurel and Hardy (in Perfect Day and Be Big!, respectively).
Edgar Kennedy, master of the "slow burn," often appeared as a cop, a hostile neighbor or a relative.
Walter Long played grizzled, unshaven, physically threatening villains.
Sam Lufkin appeared several times, usually as a cop or streetcar conductor.
Charles Middleton made a handful of appearances, usually as a sourpuss adversary.
James C. Morton appeared as a bartender or exasperated policeman.
Vivien Oakland appeared in several early silent films, and later talkies including Scram! and Way Out West.
Blanche Payson, a former policewoman, was featured in several sound shorts, including Oliver's formidable wife in Helpmates.
Daphne Pollard was featured as Oliver's diminutive but daunting wife.
Viola Richard appeared in several early silent films, most notably as the beautiful cave girl in Flying Elephants (1928).
Charley Rogers, an English actor and gag writer, appeared several times.
Tiny Sandford was a tall, burly, physically imposing character actor who played authority figures, notably cops.
Thelma Todd appeared several times before her own career as a leading lady comedienne.
Ben Turpin, the cross-eyed Mack Sennett comedy star, made two memorable appearances.
Ellinor Vanderveer made many appearances as a dowager, high society matron or posh party guest.

Music

The duo's famous signature tune, known variously as "The Cuckoo Song", "Ku-Ku" or "The Dance of the Cuckoos", was composed by Roach musical director Marvin Hatley as the on-the-hour chime for KFVD, the Roach studio's radio station. Laurel heard the tune on the station and asked Hatley if they could use it as the Laurel and Hardy theme song. The original theme, recorded by two clarinets in 1930, was recorded again with a full orchestra in 1935. Leroy Shield composed the majority of the music used in the Laurel and Hardy short sound films. A compilation of songs from their films, titled Trail of the Lonesome Pine, was released in 1975. The title track was released as a single in the UK and reached #2 in the charts.

Influence and legacy
 
Laurel and Hardy's influence over a very broad range of comedy and other genres has been considerable. Lou Costello of the famed duo of Abbott and Costello, stated "They were the funniest comedy duo of all time", adding "Most critics and film scholars throughout the years have agreed with this assessment."
Writers, artists and performers as diverse as Samuel Beckett, Jerry Lewis, Peter Sellers, Marcel Marceau Steve Martin, John Cleese, Harold Pinter, Alec Guinness, J. D. Salinger, René Magritte and Kurt Vonnegut amongst many others, have acknowledged an artistic debt. Starting in the 1960s, the exposure on television of (especially) their short films has ensured a continued influence on generations of comedians.

Posthumous revivals and popular culture
Since the 1930s, the works of Laurel and Hardy have been released again in numerous theatrical reissues, television revivals (broadcast, especially public television and cable), 16 mm and 8 mm home movies, feature-film compilations and home video. After Stan Laurel's death in 1965, there were two major motion-picture tributes: Laurel and Hardy's Laughing '20s was Robert Youngson's compilation of the team's silent-film highlights, and The Great Race was a large-scale salute to slapstick that director Blake Edwards dedicated to "Mr. Laurel and Mr. Hardy". For many years the duo were impersonated by Jim MacGeorge (as Laurel) and Chuck McCann (as Hardy) in children's TV shows and television commercials for various products.

Numerous colorized versions of copyright-free Laurel and Hardy features and shorts have been reproduced by a multitude of production studios. Although the results of adding color were often in dispute, many popular titles are currently only available in the colorized version. The color process often affects the sharpness of the image, with some scenes being altered or deleted, depending on the source material used. Their film Helpmates was the first film to undergo the process and was released by Colorization Inc., a subsidiary of Hal Roach Studios, in 1983. Colorization was a success for the studio and Helpmates was released on home video with the colorized version of The Music Box in 1986.

There are three Laurel and Hardy museums. One is in Laurel's birthplace, Ulverston, United Kingdom and another one is in Hardy's birthplace, Harlem, Georgia, United States.
The third one is located in Solingen, Germany. Maurice Sendak showed three identical Oliver Hardy figures as bakers preparing cakes for the morning in his award-winning 1970 children's book In the Night Kitchen. This is treated as a clear example of "interpretative illustration" wherein the comedians' inclusion harked back to the author's childhood. The Beatles used cut-outs of Stan Laurel and Oliver Hardy in the cutout celebrity crowd for the cover of their 1967 album Sgt. Pepper's Lonely Hearts Club Band. A 2005 poll by fellow comedians and comedy insiders of the top 50 comedians for The Comedian's Comedian, a TV documentary broadcast on UK's Channel 4, voted the duo the seventh-greatest comedy act ever, making them the top double act on the list.

Merchandiser Larry Harmon claimed ownership of Laurel's and Hardy's likenesses and has issued Laurel and Hardy toys and coloring books. He also co-produced a series of Laurel and Hardy cartoons in 1966 with Hanna-Barbera Productions. His animated versions of Laurel and Hardy guest-starred in a 1972 episode of Hanna-Barbera's The New Scooby-Doo Movies. In 1999, Harmon produced a direct-to-video feature live-action comedy entitled The All New Adventures of Laurel & Hardy in For Love or Mummy. Actors Bronson Pinchot and Gailard Sartain were cast playing the lookalike nephews of Laurel and Hardy named Stanley Thinneus Laurel and Oliver Fatteus Hardy.

The Indian comedy duo Ghory and Dixit was known as the Indian Laurel and Hardy. In 2011 the German/French TV station Arte released in co-production with the German TV station ZDF the 90-minute documentary Laurel & Hardy: Their Lives and Magic. The film, titled in the original German Laurel and Hardy: Die komische Liebesgeschichte von "Dick & Doof", was written and directed by German film-maker Andreas Baum. It includes many movie clips, rare and unpublished photographs, interviews with family, fans, friends, showbiz pals and newly recovered footage. Laurel's daughter Lois Laurel Hawes said of the film: "The best documentary about Laurel and Hardy I have ever seen!". It has also been released as a Director's Cut with a length of 105 minutes, plus 70 minutes of bonus materials on DVD.

Appreciation society

The official Laurel and Hardy appreciation society is known as The Sons of the Desert, after a fraternal society in their film of the same name (1933). It was established in New York City in 1965 by Laurel and Hardy biographer John McCabe, with Orson Bean, Al Kilgore, Chuck McCann, and John Municino as founding members, with the sanction of Stan Laurel. Since the group's inception, well over 150 chapters of the organization have formed across North America, Europe, and Australia. An Emmy-winning film documentary about the group, Revenge of the Sons of the Desert, has been released on DVD as part of The Laurel and Hardy Collection, Vol. 1.

Around the world
Laurel and Hardy are popular around the world but are known under different names in various countries and languages.

Biopic
A biopic titled Stan & Ollie directed by Jon S. Baird and starring Steve Coogan as Stan and John C. Reilly as Oliver was released in 2018 and chronicled the duo's 1953 tour of Great Britain and Ireland. The film received positive reviews from critics, garnering a 94% "Fresh" rating on Rotten Tomatoes. For their performances, Reilly and Coogan were nominated for a Golden Globe and a BAFTA award respectively.

Filmographies
 Laurel and Hardy filmography
 Oliver Hardy filmography
 Stan Laurel filmography

See also
 Pekka and Pätkä

References
Notes

Citations

Bibliography

 Andrews, Robert. Famous Lines: A Columbia Dictionary of Familiar Quotations. New York: Columbia University Press, 1997. 
 Anobile, Richard J., ed. A Fine Mess: Verbal and Visual Gems from The Crazy World of Laurel & Hardy. New York: Crown Publishers, 1975. 
 Barr, Charles. Laurel and Hardy (Movie Paperbacks). Berkeley: University of California Press, 1968; First edition 1967, London: Studio Vista. 
 Bergen, Ronald. The Life and Times of Laurel and Hardy. New York: Smithmark, 1992. 
 Brooks, Leo M. The Laurel & Hardy Stock Company. Hilversum, Netherlands: Blotto Press, 1997. 
 Byron, Stuart and Elizabeth Weis, eds. The National Society of Film Critics on Movie Comedy. New York: Grossman/Viking, 1977. 
 Crowther, Bruce. Laurel and Hardy: Clown Princes of Comedy. New York: Columbus Books, 1987. 
 Cullen, Frank, Florence Hackman and Donald McNeilly. Vaudeville, Old and New: An Encyclopedia of Variety Performers in America. London: Routledge, 2007. 
 Durgnat, Raymond. "Beau Chumps and Church Bells" (essay). The Crazy Mirror: Hollywood Comedy and the American Image. New York: Dell Publishing, 1970. 
 Everson, William K. The Complete Films of Laurel and Hardy. New York: Citadel, 2000; First edition 1967. 
 Everson, William K. The Films of Hal Roach. New York: Museum of Modern Art, 1971. 
 Gehring, Wes D. Laurel & Hardy: A Bio-Bibliography. Burnham Bucks, UK: Greenwood Press, 1990. 
 Gehring, Wes D. Film Clowns of the Depression: Twelve Defining Comic Performances. Jefferson, North Carolina: McFarland & Co., 2007. .
 Guiles, Fred Lawrence. Stan: The Life of Stan Laurel. New York: Stein & Day, 1991; First edition 1980. .
 Harness, Kyp. The Art of Laurel and Hardy: Graceful Calamity in the Films. Jefferson, North Carolina: McFarland & Co., 2006. .
 Kanin, Garson. Together Again!: Stories of the Great Hollywood Teams. New York: Doubleday & Co., 1981. .
 Kerr, Walter. The Silent Clowns. New York: Da Capo Press, 1990, First edition 1975, Alfred A. Knopf. .
 Lahue, Kalton C. World of Laughter: The Motion Picture Comedy Short, 1910–1930. Norman, Oklahoma: University of Oklahoma Press, 1966. .
 Louvish, Simon. Stan and Ollie: The Roots of Comedy: The Double Life of Laurel and Hardy. London: Faber & Faber, 2001. .
 Louvish, Simon. Stan and Ollie: The Roots of Comedy: The Double Life of Laurel and Hardy. New York: St. Martin's Press, 2002. .
 Maltin, Leonard. Movie Comedy Teams. New York: New American Library, 1985; First edition 1970. .
 Maltin, Leonard, Selected Short Subjects (First published as The Great Movie Shorts. New York: Crown Publishers, 1972.) New York: Da Capo Press, 1983. .
 Maltin, Leonard. The Laurel & Hardy Book (Curtis Films Series). Sanibel Island, Florida: Ralph Curtis Books, 1973. .
 Maltin, Leonard. The Great Movie Comedians. New York: Crown Publishers, 1978. .
 Marriot, A. J. Laurel & Hardy: The British Tours. Hitchen, Herts, UK: AJ Marriot, 1993. 
 Marriot, A. J. Laurel and Hardy: The U.S. Tours. Hitchen, Herts, UK: AJ Marriot, 2011. 
 Mast, Gerald. The Comic Mind: Comedy and the Movies. Chicago: University of Chicago Press, 1979; First edition 1973. .
 McCabe, John. Mr. Laurel & Mr. Hardy: An Affectionate Biography. London: Robson Books, 2004; First edition 1961; Reprint: New York: Doubleday & Co., 1966. .
 McCabe, John. The Comedy World of Stan Laurel. Beverly Hills: Moonstone Press, 1990; First edition 1974, Doubleday & Co. .
 McCabe, John, with Al Kilgore and Richard W. Bann. Laurel & Hardy. New York: Bonanza Books, 1983; First edition 1975, E.P. Dutton. .
 McCabe, John. Babe: The Life of Oliver Hardy. London: Robson Books, 2004; First edition 1989, Citadel. .
 McCaffrey, Donald W. "Duet of Incompetence" (essay). The Golden Age of Sound Comedy: Comic Films and Comedians of the Thirties. New York: A.S. Barnes, 1973. .
 McGarry, Annie. Laurel & Hardy. London: Bison Group, 1992. .
 MacGillivray, Scott. Laurel & Hardy: From the Forties Forward. Second edition: New York: iUniverse, 2009 ; first edition: Lanham, Maryland: Vestal Press, 1998.
 McIntyre, Willie. The Laurel & Hardy Digest: A Cocktail of Love and Hisses. Ayrshire, Scotland: Willie McIntyre, 1998. .
 McIver, Stuart B. Dreamers, Schemers and Scalawags. Sarasota, Florida: Pineapple Press Inc., 1998. 
 Mitchell, Glenn. The Laurel & Hardy Encyclopedia. New York: Batsford, 2010; First edition 1995. .
 Nollen, Scott Allen. The Boys: The Cinematic World of Laurel and Hardy. Jefferson, North Carolina: McFarland & Co., 1989. .
 Okuda, Ted and James L. Neibaur. Stan Without Ollie: The Stan Laurel Solo Films: 1917–1927. Jefferson, North Carolina: McFarland & Co., 2012. .
 Robb, Brian J. The Pocket Essential Laurel & Hardy. Manchester, UK: Pocket Essentials, 2008. .
 Robinson, David. The Great Funnies: A History of Film Comedy. New York: E.P. Dutton, 1969. .
 Sanders, Jonathan. Another Fine Dress: Role Play in the Films of Laurel and Hardy. London: Cassell, 1995. .
 Scagnetti, Jack. The Laurel & Hardy Scrapbook. New York: Jonathan David Publishers, 1982. .
 Sendak, Maurice. In the Night Kitchen. New York: HarperCollins, 1970. .
 Skretvedt, Randy. Laurel and Hardy: The Magic Behind the Movies. Anaheim, California: Past Times Publishing Co., 1996; First edition 1987, Moonstone Press. .
 Smith, Leon. Following the Comedy Trail: A Guide to Laurel & Hardy and Our Gang Film Locations. Littleton, Massachusetts: G.J. Enterprises, 1984. .
 Staveacre, Tony. Slapstick!: The Illustrated Story. London: Angus & Robertson Publishers, 1987. .
 Stone, Rob, et al. Laurel or Hardy: The Solo Films of Stan Laurel and Oliver Hardy. Manchester, New Hampshire: Split Reel, 1996. .
 Ward, Richard Lewis. A History of the Hal Roach Studios. Carbondale, Illinois: Southern Illinois University Press, 2006. .
 Weales, Gerald. Canned Goods as Caviar: American Film Comedy of the 1930s. Chicago: University of Chicago Press, 1985. .

External links

Official The Sons of the Desert website
The Laurel and Hardy Magazine website

 
Comedy duos
Film duos
Silent film comedians
American male comedians
English male comedians
American male film actors
English male film actors
American male silent film actors
English male silent film actors
20th Century Studios contract players
Hal Roach Studios short film series
Metro-Goldwyn-Mayer contract players
Articles containing video clips
20th-century American male actors
20th-century English male actors